The 1910–11 Ottawa Hockey Club season was the club's 26th season, second in the National Hockey Association. Ottawa won the league championship for the O'Brien Cup and took over the Stanley Cup from the Montreal Wanderers.

Regular season
The team opened the season with ten consecutive wins, not losing until February in Renfrew. This matched the club record of ten consecutive wins set in 1909–10. Marty Walsh and "Dubbie" Kerr led the league in goals with 37 and 32.

Final standings

Schedule and results

Player statistics

Goaltending averages

Leading scorers

Stanley Cup challenges

Ottawa played two challenges after the season at The Arena in Ottawa.

Galt vs. Ottawa
Five members of the Galt team were from the Ottawa area or had played for Ottawa: Hague, Baird, Murphy, Smith and Berlinguette. Odds given before the game had Ottawa as 3–1 favourites. Bruce Ridpath who had been knocked out in the final game of the season played in the challenge game. Only 2,500 attended the game, which was described as a 'poor exhibition' with 'water covering the ice in several places.' Ottawa led 5–0 before Galt scored two. The teams traded goals to the finish to make the final 7–4.

Referee: Russell Bowie Umpire: Duncan Campbell

Port Arthur vs. Ottawa

Marty Walsh was a "one-man wrecking crew", scoring ten goals against Port Arthur.

See also
1910–11 NHA season
1910 in sports
1911 in sports
List of Stanley Cup champions

References
 Podnieks, Andrew; Hockey Hall of Fame (2004). Lord Stanley's Cup. Triumph Books, 12, 50. . 
 

Ottawa Hockey Club
Ottawa Senators (original) seasons
Stanley Cup championship seasons